Ugarte or uharte is a Basque word meaning "island".
It can also be spelt Huarte or Hugarte in Spanish. Notable people with the surname include:

Adriana Ugarte (born 1985), Spanish actress
Agustín Jerónimo de Iturbide y Huarte (1807–1866), Prince Imperial of Mexico
Alfonso Ugarte (1847–1880), Peruvian military commander
Alfredo Ugarte, Chilean hurdler
Alirio Ugarte Pelayo (1923–1966), Venezuelan politician
Ana Carolina Ugarte (born 1992), Venezuelan model and beauty pageant titleholder
Andoni Ugarte (born 1995), Spanish footballer
Augusto José Ramón Pinochet Ugarte (1915–2006), Chilean military officer and dictator
Francisco Ugarte (footballer, born 1959), Chilean footballer
Francisco Ugarte (footballer, born 1986), German-Chilean footballer
Gloria Ugarte, Argentinian actress
Jose de la Torre Ugarte (1798–1878), Peruvian lyricist
José Humberto Ugarte (born 1980), Costa Rican footballer
José Luis Ugarte (1928–2008), Spanish sailor
John Huarte (born 1944), American football quarterback
Juan de Ugarte (1662–1730), Jesuit missionary and explorer
Juan Huarte de San Juan (c. 1530–1592), Spanish physician and psychologist
Juan Ugarte (born 1982), Spanish footballer
Juan Vicente Ugarte del Pino (1923–2015), Peruvian historian and jurist
Julio Ugarte y Ugarte (1890–1949), Peruvian writer
Manuel Ugarte (footballer) (born 2001), Uruguayan footballer
Manuel Ugarte (writer) (1875–1951), Argentinian author
Manuel Ugarte Soto (born 1940), Chilean police officer and lawyer
Marcelino Ugarte (1855–1929), Argentinian jurist and politician
María Dolores Ugarte, Spanish statistician
María Ugarte (1914–2011), Spanish-Dominican journalist and writer
Nicolás Armentia Ugarte (1845–1909), Spanish missionary and bishop
Óscar Ugarte (born 1944), Peruvian physician and politician
Paula Ugarte (born 1987), Argentinian footballer
Pedro Ugarte (born 1963), Spanish writer and columnist
Poly Ugarte (born 1959), Ecuadorian activist, lawyer, and politician
Renzo Pi Hugarte (1934–2012), Uruguayan anthropologist
Salvador de Iturbide y Huarte (1820–1856), prince of Mexico
Sebastian Ugarte, Filipino footballer and sports executive
Víctor Ugarte (1926–1995), Bolivian footballer
Xóchitl Ugarte (born 1979), Mexican voice actress
Zoila Ugarte de Landívar (1864–1969), Ecuadorian writer and suffragist

Fictional characters
 Guillermo Ugarte, a character in the film Casablanca

See also
 Alfonso Ugarte de Tacna, Peruvian football club
 Eguren Ugarte, a family-owned winery in the Basque Country, Spain
 Estadio Víctor Agustín Ugarte, a stadium in Potosí, Bolivia
 Huarte/Uharte, a town in Navarre, Spain
 Uharte-Arakil, a town in Navarre, Spain

Basque-language surnames